East Ham is a constituency in the London Borough of Newham represented in the House of Commons of the UK Parliament since its creation in 1997 by Stephen Timms of the Labour Party.

History
Predecessor seats and constituent wards
The seat was formed in 1997 when Newham North East and part of Newham South were replaced by the seat.

East Ham's wards have long been Labour strongholds. Ron Leighton (Lab) was MP for the old Newham North East from 1979 until his death in 1994.

Summary of results
Stephen Timms (Lab) has represented the seat since its creation in 1997. At the 2010 general election, Timms received the most votes of any MP (35,471) and largest majority (27,826) of any MP. The seat has the second-highest numerical majority and fourth-highest percentage of majority in the country, behind other staunch Labour "safe seats" in Merseyside. Every component ward has only Labour councillors (resulting from local elections) and the party's general election candidate has achieved an absolute majority in the five elections since creation, against a wide assortment of political parties.

The RESPECT Coalition stood a candidate once, hoping to benefit from opposition to the Iraq war in the 2005 general election which saw elsewhere their first MP, and took second place.

Constituency profile 
Just north of the River Thames is the seat of East Ham. The constituency contains the King George V and the Royal Albert Docks, and London City Airport.

The area benefits from the Thames Gateway regeneration of the London Riverside area. The Silvertown Quays redevelopment will create an innovative quarter and an estimated 21,000 jobs.

Three quarters of the population are non-white; over a third are Muslim and more than half are Asian - the fourth highest proportion of any constituency in England and Wales, according to ONS 2011 Census figures. There is also a large black population.

Unemployment is significantly higher than the national average of 3.5%. In the constituency 9.9% of people are unemployed.

At the 2018, 2014 and 2010 council elections, Labour won all of the seats in the constituency. One of the safest Labour seats in the country, Stephen Timms has been MP since 1994.

Boundaries 

1997–2010: The London Borough of Newham wards of Castle, Central, Greatfield, Kensington, Little Ilford, Manor Park, Monega, St Stephen's, South, and Wall End.

2010–present: The London Borough of Newham wards of Beckton, Boleyn, East Ham Central, East Ham North, East Ham South, Green Street East, Little Ilford, Manor Park, Royal Docks, and Wall End.

The constituency covers the eastern half of Newham, including East Ham, Beckton, Little Ilford and Manor Park.

Members of Parliament

Election results

Elections in the 2010s 

This was the largest numerical majority of any seat in the 2010 general election.

Elections in the 2000s

Elections in the 1990s

See also 
 List of parliamentary constituencies in London

Notes

References

External links 
Politics Resources (Election results from 1922 onwards)
Electoral Calculus (Election results from 1955 onwards)

Politics of the London Borough of Newham
Parliamentary constituencies in London
Constituencies of the Parliament of the United Kingdom established in 1997
East Ham